Pelargonium grandiflorum is a species of flowering plant in the family Geraniaceae, native to the southwestern Cape Provinces of South Africa. It may be a parent of the cultivated Pelargonium × domesticum (regal pelargonium) with Pelargonium cucullatum.

References

grandiflorum
Endemic flora of South Africa
Flora of the Cape Provinces
Plants described in 1800